Kodansha USA Publishing, LLC is a publishing company based in New York, US, and a subsidiary of Japan's largest publishing company Kodansha. Established in July 2008, Kodansha USA publishes books relating to Japan, Japanese culture, and manga, the latter under their Kodansha Manga imprint (formerly Kodansha Comics).

In 2020, Kodansha announced that it had consolidated Kodansha Advanced Media and Vertical into Kodansha USA Publishing, with Kodansha Advanced Media general manager Alvin Lu becoming the President and CEO of Kodansha USA Publishing.

On March 9, 2021, Kodansha USA Publishing announced it had rebranded and relaunched its website, and unified Kodansha Comics, Kodansha USA International, and Vertical under the Kodansha name, and Kodansha Comics being renamed Kodansha Manga.

Kodansha Comics
Kodansha Comics is an imprint of Kodansha USA Publishing who are responsible for the localization and publication of Kodansha manga. Established in 2009, the imprint was established to coincide with the 100th anniversary of Kodansha. The imprint's launching titles were Ghost in the Shell by Masamune Shirow and Akira by Katsuhiro Otomo, both of which were previously published in English by Dark Horse Comics.

Kodansha Comics later began to acquire series that were previously published by Tokyopop, after their licenses were made to expire by Kodansha. Although bearing the Kodansha name, Kodansha Comics was not intended to be the sole distributor of Kodansha titles, with Del Rey Manga publishing many of Kodansha's titles until the company was shut down in 2010. After the shut down of Del Rey Manga on October 4, 2010, Kodansha Comics gradually began to publish some Del Rey Manga titles, with Random House acting as the distributor for the imprint.

Kodansha Advanced Media

Kodansha Advanced Media LLC was an American distribution company, based in San Francisco, and established in December 4, 2014. The company was a subsidiary of Kodansha, and a sister company of Kodansha USA Publishing. Kodansha Advanced Media handled the digital distribution of Kodansha Comics manga, as well as digital distribution of select Vertical titles. Kodansha Advanced Media also maintained the Kodansha Comics website.

Kodansha Advanced Media was established in 2014 with funding from Kodansha USA Publishing in order to handle the digital distribution of Kodansha Comics' manga titles in English. In February 2015, Kodansha and Digital Garage announced a joint venture to distribute manga digitally in North America, establishing a Japanese-based joint venture company to invest in digital distribution services, and using Kodansha Advanced Media to distribute manga via websites and smartphone apps. Kodansha Advanced Media is also responsible for handling film releases and events, and in 2015, were responsible for releasing an app for Yamada-kun and the Seven Witches for English-speaking audiences.

In response to piracy, Kodansha Advanced Media simul-translated and simul-published Kodansha Comics titles, as well as released certain titles on digital platforms prior to physical printing. In December 2015, Kodansha Advanced Media announced that they had made Kodansha Comics titles available in North American public libraries digitally through OverDrive.

References

External links

 
 

American subsidiaries of foreign companies
Publishing companies established in 2008
Kodansha
Manga distributors
Publishing companies of the United States
American companies established in 2008